NA-41 Lakki Marwat is a constituency for the National Assembly of Pakistan. It covers whole of district Lakki Marwat. The constituency was formerly known as NA-27 Lakki Marwat from 1977 to 2018. The name changed to NA-36 Lakki Marwat after the delimitation in 2018 and to NA-41 (Lakki Marwat) after the delimitation in 2022.

Members of Parliament

1977–2002: NA-27 Lakki Marwat

2002–2018: NA-27 Lakki Marwat

2018-2022: NA-36 Lakki Marwat

Elections since 2002

2002 general election

A total of 2,078 votes were rejected.

2008 general election

A total of 3,874 votes were rejected.

2013 general election

A total of 5,277 votes were rejected.

2013 By-election
A by-election took place on 22 August 2013.

2018 general election 

General elections were held on 25 July 2018.

See also
NA-40 North Waziristan
NA-42 Tank

References

External links 
 Election result's official website

36
36